John Holt, D.D. was an Oxford college head.

Holt was educated at Corpus Christi College, Oxford. He held the livings at Welbury, Cranleigh and Ewhurst. Holt was President of Corpus Christi College, Oxford, from 1629 until his death on 10 January 1631.

References

1631 deaths
Alumni of Corpus Christi College, Oxford
Presidents of Corpus Christi College, Oxford
17th-century English Anglican priests